The 2013 All-Ireland Minor Hurling Championship (also known as the Electric Ireland GAA Hurling All-Ireland Minor Championship for sponsorship reasons) was the 83rd staging of the All-Ireland Minor Hurling Championship since its establishment by the Gaelic Athletic Association in 1928. The championship began on 11 April 2013 and ended on 8 September 2013.

Tipperary entered the championship as the defending champions; however, they were beaten by Limerick in the Munster semi-final.

On 8 September 2013 Waterford won the championship following a 1-21 to 0-16 defeat of Galway in the All-Ireland final. This was their 3rd All-Ireland title overall and their first since 1948.

Waterford's Patrick Curran was the championship's top scorer with 3-56.

Results

Leinster Minor Hurling Championship

First round

Second round

Quarter-finals

Semi-finals

Final

Munster Minor Hurling Championship

Quarter-finals

Play-off

Semi-finals

Finals

Ulster Minor Hurling Championship

Semi-finals

Final

All-Ireland Minor Hurling Championship

Quarter-finals

Semi-finals

Final

Championship statistics

Top scorers

Top scorer overall

Top scorer in a single game

Miscellaneous

 The Munster semi-final play-off between Clare and Waterford, originally fixed for 17 April, was postponed by two weeks due to adverse weather conditions.
 Laois qualified for the Leinster minor hurling final for the first time since 1991.
 Waterford's Munster semi-final win was their first ever victory over Cork at a Cork venue at minor level.
 Limerick and Waterford met in the Munster minor hurling final for the first time since 1958.
 The semi-final between Limerick and Galway would prove to be controversial due to the incorrect disallowing of an early Limerick point by the new Hawk-Eye  system. Limerick's attempts to have the results overturned due to the error were unsuccessful.

External links
 Leinster Minor Hurling Championship
 Munster Minor Hurling Championship

References

Minor
All-Ireland Minor Hurling Championship
Hurling controversies